The 2002 Majorca Open was a men's tennis tournament played on outdoor clay courts in Majorca, Spain and was part of the International Series of the 2002 ATP Tour. It was the eighth edition of the tournament and was held from 29 April through 5 May 2002. Eighth-seeded Gastón Gaudio won the singles title.

Finals

Singles

 Gastón Gaudio defeated  Jarkko Nieminen 6–2, 6–3
 It was Gaudio's 2nd title of the year and the 2nd of his career.

Doubles

 Mahesh Bhupathi /  Leander Paes defeated  Julian Knowle /  Michael Kohlmann 6–2, 6–4
 It was Bhupathi's 2nd title of the year and the 23rd of his career. It was Paes's 2nd title of the year and the 26th of his career.

References

External links
 Official website 
 ATP tournament profile

 
Majorca Open
April 2002 sports events in Europe
May 2002 sports events in Europe